The Chennai-Mysuru high speed rail corridor is India's third high-speed rail project after the Mumbai Ahmedabad High Speed Rail Corridor and Delhi Varanasi High Speed Rail Corridor. The 435 km HSR corridor will connect Chennai to Mysuru through 9 stations.

History 

In 2013, Karnataka Chief Minister Siddaramaiah, suggested that the state wanted to run bullet trains from Mysuru to Chennai via Bengaluru, and was conducting talks with his counterparts in Japan about the topic. He commented that the journey could be done in less than two hours, though no studies had yet been conducted prior to those words.

A feasibility study by China on the project was submitted to the Federal Government in June 2015. While Germany also proposed to conduct its own feasibility study at the same time. The then Railways Minister, Suresh Prabhu, suggested that the route would be one of the next high-speed railways to be implemented in India.

Japan Railway Technical Service (JARTS) and Oriental Consultants submitted a feasibility study in early 2016 about constructing the high-speed railway line through a PPP with the government.  French state-owned company SNCF also expressed an interest in building a high-speed railway line too.

In early 2017, Indian Railways (IR) responded to a proposal by Elon Musk for a Hyperloop to connect the two cities in thirty minutes, saying that it would be unlikely due to government bureaucracy.

During the June 2017 opening of Bengaluru's Green Line Metro, Japan’s Ambassador to India, Kenji Hiramatsu, suggested that the railway line should be built with support from Japanese development funds.

Description 
The high-speed railway line would mainly be built alongside the existing railway between the two cities. However, a  viaduct between Bangarapet and Vaniyambadi, as well as a  viaduct between Katpadi and Arakkonam, would need to be constructed due to hilly terrain.

There would be two new railway stations built underground in Chennai and one at Bengaluru, would witness the high-speed trains, running at around

Stations
The Chennai Mysuru high speed rail corridor is planned to have a total of nine stations.

Project status

2018
November: German government submitted a feasibility study to the Railway Board

2020
June: Indian Railways sanctioned the feasibility studies for the corridor

2021
February: Aarvee-GSL awarded the contract for Chennai-Mysuru HSR's LiDAR & Alignment Design contract.

2022
July: Infrastructure Minister of Karnataka, V. Somanna reveled that the centre had asked NHSRCL to submit the DPR to implement the project. The state government held a high level meeting and discussed about alignment going through the upcoming 10-lane Bengaluru-Mysuru highway. While the state government is set to provide the land, the centre will bear the entire project's cost.

See also
 High-speed rail in India
 Mumbai–Ahmedabad high-speed rail corridor
 Mumbai-Hyderabad high-speed rail corridor
 Diamond Quadrilateral
 National High Speed Rail Corporation Limited
Other
 Train 20
 Vande Bharat Express

References

C
Standard gauge railways in India
Rail transport in Delhi
Rail transport in Uttar Pradesh
Proposed railway lines in India
Modi administration initiatives
Transport in Mysore
Transport in Chennai
India–Japan relations
2030 in rail transport